Mohican II is a historic steel riveted hull excursion steamboat located at Lake George in Warren County, New York. She was built in 1907-08 for the Lake George Steamboat Company by the T.S. Marvel Shipuilding Company of Newburgh, New York. She measures  in length,  in beam, and  depth of hold. She was designed for use on Lake George as an excursion vessel, has been in continuous use for over 100 years and is the oldest passenger vessel in the United States.

It was listed on the National Register of Historic Places in 2010.

References

External links
Lake George Steamboat Company

Buildings and structures in Warren County, New York
Ships on the National Register of Historic Places in New York (state)
1908 ships
National Register of Historic Places in Warren County, New York